The scissor (pl. scissores) was a type of Roman gladiator. Very little is known about scissores besides the name, which means 'cutter, cleaver, render' (from scindo). 

German historian and experimental archaeologist Marcus Junkelmann has speculated, based on a possible  image of a scissor, that this type of gladiator fought using a weapon consisting of a hardened steel tube that encased the gladiator's entire forearm, with the hand end capped off and a semicircular blade attached to it. A handle inside the tube might have allowed the gladiator to maintain control in the heat of battle. This weapon might have been both deadly and versatile; the gladiator could use his protected arm to block his opponent's blows and quickly counterattack, the shape of the blade being such that even the slightest touch could cause a serious wound.

See also 
 List of Roman gladiator types

References

Gladiator types